John Royle may refer to:

 John Royle (EastEnders), a character in the soap opera EastEnders
 John Forbes Royle (1799–1858), British botanist and teacher of materia medica